Adamsville is a city in western Jefferson County, Alabama. It is north from the Birmingham suburb of Pleasant Grove. It initially incorporated in 1901 (although the 1910 U.S. Census stated 1900), but disincorporated in 1915. It later reincorporated in 1953. According to the 2010 census, this town had a population of 4,522, down from its peak population of 4,965 in 2000.

Geography
Adamsville is located at  (33.590411, -86.949166).

Demographics

Adamsville

Adamsville first appeared on the 1910 U.S. Census as an incorporated town. It disincorporated in 1915 and did not appear on the census again until 1950, when it reported as an unincorporated village. It reincorporated in 1953 as a town and has appeared on every successive census to date. In the 1960s, it upgraded from town to city status.

2000 Census
At the 2000 census, there were 4,965 people, 1,930 households and 1,464 families living in the town. The racial makeup of the town was 75.79% White, 22.82% Black or African American, 0.40% Native American, 0.14% Asian, 0.02% Pacific Islander, 0.16% from other races, and 0.66% from two or more races. 0.52% of the population were Hispanic or Latino of any race.

There were 1,930 households, of which 32.1% had children under the age of 18 living with them, 59.1% were married couples living together, 13.5% had a female householder with no husband present, and 24.1% were non-families. 21.7% of all households were made up of individuals, and 9.1% had someone living alone who was 65 years of age or older. The average household size was 2.56 and the average family size was 2.97.

23.1% of the population were under the age of 18, 8.0% from 18 to 24, 27.6% from 25 to 44, 25.1% from 45 to 64, and 16.1% who were 65 years of age or older. The median age was 39 years. For every 100 females, there were 90.9 males. For every 100 females age 18 and over, there were 88.2 males.

The median household income was $39,563 and the median family income was $46,270. Males had a median income of $36,188 compared with $22,292 for females. The per capita income for the town was $18,496. About 5.1% of families and 6.4% of the population were below the poverty line, including 10.3% of those under age 18 and 9.1% of those age 65 or over.

2010 census
At the 2010 census, there were 4,522 people, 1,752 households and 1,253 families living in the town. The racial makeup of the town was 52.3% White, 44.9% Black or African American, 0.5% Native American, 0.3% Asian, 0.0% Pacific Islander, 1.1% from other races, and 0.8% from two or more races. 2.3% of the population were Hispanic or Latino of any race.

There were 1,752 households, of which 27.7% had children under the age of 18 living with them, 47.6% were married couples living together, 18.0% had a female householder with no husband present, and 28.5% were non-families. 24.7% of all households were made up of individuals, and 10.4% had someone living alone who was 65 years of age or older. The average household size was 2.57 and the average family size was 3.08.

23.6% of the population were under the age of 18, 8.1% from 18 to 24, 25.1% from 25 to 44, 27.2% from 45 to 64, and 15.9% who were 65 years of age or older. The median age was 39.9 years. For every 100 females, there were 88.6 males. For every 100 females age 18 and over, there were 92.4 males.

The median household income was $52,167 and the median family income was $56,551. Males had a median income of $41,176 compared with $31,349 for females. The per capita income for the town was $23,461. About 7.9% of families and 11.0% of the population were below the poverty line, including 21.1% of those under age 18 and 10.1% of those age 65 or over.

2020 census

As of the 2020 United States census, there were 4,366 people, 1,471 households, and 1,032 families residing in the city.

Adamsville Census Division (1960-70)

The Jefferson County Census Division of Adamsville was created in 1960 as part of a general reorganization of counties, which included the town of Adamsville and the surrounding areas. From 1910-1960, Adamsville had been in the unnamed 39th precinct of Jefferson County. In 1980, Adamsville became a part of the Graysville-Adamsville Census Division.

Notable people
 Henry E. Erwin, Medal of Honor recipient during World War II
 Brandon Johnson, former NFL linebacker and 2001 Minor High School graduate
 Jim King, head football coach of the University of West Alabama from 1973 to 1976
 Bryan Thomas, former linebacker and defensive end for the New York Jets and 1996 graduate of Minor High School
 Chris Williams, professional basketball player and 1998 graduate of Minor High School
 Nick Williams, NFL defensive end and 2008 graduate of Minor High School

Photo Gallery

References

Notes

References

Cities in Alabama
Cities in Jefferson County, Alabama
Birmingham metropolitan area, Alabama